Cumalar is a village in the District of Karpuzlu, Aydın Province, Turkey. As of 2010, it had a population of 212 people.

References

Villages in Karpuzlu District